Tadeusz P. Chorzelski (1928–1999) was a Polish dermatologist. He was one of the founders of immunodermatology. He published more than 400 original research papers, 28 book chapters, and 5 monographs. Chorzelski was elected a member honoris causa of the national societies of Great Britain, France, Germany, Austria, Mexico and Norway.

Polish dermatologists
1928 births
1999 deaths
20th-century Polish physicians